Treasure hunters are people who search for treasure.

Treasure hunters or Treasure Hunters may also refer to:

 Treasure Hunters (comic), a graphic novel
 Treasure Hunters (book series), a young adult children's series by James Patterson 
 Treasure Hunters (novel), a children's adventure novel by James Patterson with Chris Grabenstein and Mark Shulman
 Treasure Hunters (film), a Hong Kong kung fu film
 Treasure Hunters (TV series), an American reality television series
 Treasure Hunters (Universal Studios Singapore), a vintage car attraction
 Treasure Hunter, an Australian radio game show
 Treasure Hunter G, a 1996 video game
 Treasure Hunter (video game), a 1997 video game
 The Treasure Hunter, a 2009 Taiwanese film

See also
Treasure hunt (disambiguation)
Fortune Hunter (disambiguation)